Bicol Isarog Transport System, Inc. (BITSI, also known as simply Bicol Isarog) is a Philippine bus company based in Quezon City. Bicol Isarog, along with 6 sister bus lines, operates routes that primarily serves the Bicol Region, as well as Samar Province and Leyte Province.

Overview

Bicol Isarog Transport System Inc. was formally incorporated in the Securities and Exchange Commission on April 19, 2011.  The company has then been operating the Penafrancia, RSL bus transport and Isarog Lines to include several more bus routes which makes BITSI the leading bus company in the south of Luzon. With the recent partnership with VSPintados, the company now even expands its services bringing people safer in the Eastern Visayas region particularly in Calbayog, Catbalogan, Tacloban, Ormoc and Maasin.

Fleet
Daewoo BV115 Jetliner 
Daewoo BH117H Jetliner
Higer KLQ6123 
Higer KLQ6125B 
Hino RM2PS Grandecho II 
F.S.B.B. ZK6120H
Kinglong XMQ6126Y
DMMW DM10 Sleeper Hyundai Aerospace
DMMW DM16 Sleeper Hino RM2PSS
DMMW DM16 S2 Sleeper Volvo B8R
DMMW DM16 S2 Volvo B8R
DMMW DM22T Scania "Touring"

Subsidiaries / Sister Brands
 RSL Bus Transport  
 VS Pintados Corp.
 Isarog Line
 Palawan Cherry Bus
 Legazpi St. Jude Transport Lines Inc.
 Our Lady of Salvacion Bus Lines Inc.
 Our Lady of Penãfrancia Bus Lines Inc.
 St. Rafael Transport Lines Inc.
 Florencia Transport Services Inc
 Peñafrancia Tours and Travel Transport
 Victory Liner
 Five Star Bus Company

Destinations/Ticketing Office

Metro Manila
Mirasol, Cubao, Quezon City
EDSA-Cubao, Quezon City
Arcovia City, Pasig
Parañaque Integrated Terminal Exchange, Parañaque

Laguna
Turbina, Calamba
Santa Rosa Integrated Terminal, Santa Rosa

Palawan
 Puerto Princesa City
 El Nido, Palawan

Bicol
Naga City
Legazpi City
Sorsogon Grand Terminal, Sorsogon City
 Sorsogon City
 Tabaco, Albay
 San Andres, Catanduanes
 Virac, Catanduanes
 Masbate City

Eastern Visayas
 Calbayog
 Catbalogan
 Tacloban City
 Baybay
 Maasin City
 Ormoc City

Former destinations
Ermita, Manila
Araneta City Bus Port Cubao, Quezon City
Alabang, Muntinlupa
Pasay

References

Bus companies of the Philippines
Transportation in Luzon
Transportation in the Visayas
Companies based in Quezon City